Jerrold Clifford Manock (born February 21, 1944) is an American industrial designer. He worked for Apple Computer from 1977 to 1984, contributing to housing designs for the Apple II, Apple III, and earlier compact Apple Macintosh computers. Manock is widely regarded as the "father" of the Apple Industrial Design Group. Since 1976 he is the president and principal designer of Manock Comprehensive Design, Inc., with offices in Palo Alto, California, and Burlington, Vermont.

Education and career
Manock attended Stanford University, where he earned his B.S. in mechanical engineering in 1966 and his M.S. in Mechanical Engineering–Product Design in 1968. For his master's project, he worked on a device to aid in percussion-drainage therapy for children with cystic fibrosis.

From 1968 to 1972 Manock worked as a product design engineer in the Microwave Division of Hewlett-Packard, Palo Alto, California. From 1972 to 1975 he was chief mechanical engineer at Telesensory Systems, Inc., of Palo Alto. He then worked as a freelance product design consultant; in 1977 he took on Apple Computer as a client and consulted on the product design and mechanical engineering of the Apple II personal computer.

Apple Design Team
Manock joined Apple in 1979 as corporate manager of product design. Working under the direction of Steve Jobs, Manock led the product designs of the Apple II, the Apple III, and the "Cuisinart-inspired" upright casing for the first Macintosh computer, which necessitated a detached keyboard. Manock also worked on the Disk II, Disk III, and Apple Lisa office computer.

Manock was a member of the original Apple Macintosh design team. In January 1981, when Jobs became manager of the Macintosh project, he brought in Manock and Terry Oyama to design the computer housing. According to Jason O'Grady in Apple Inc., Manock was "hand-picked" by Jef Raskin to work on the Macintosh design team. In a 1984 interview, Manock said that the initial design goal was for a computer housing with "portability", but that idea was replaced by the design goal of "minimal desk space". As a result, the design team created a keyboard that was smaller than the width of the computer. Manock himself contributed the idea of using icons on the outside of the machine rather than English words to make the Macintosh more international. This style was mirrored in the ROM, which used icons instead of English-language directions, such as a frowning face when the computer needed to reboot and a smiling face indicating booting.

Patents
Manock is the co-inventor of:
Personal computer (U.S. Patent No. D268584), 12 April 1983
Dual disk drive (U.S. Patent No. D271102), 25 October 1983
Housing for moveable cursor control for a video display (U.S. Patent No. D284284), 17 June 1986
Computer housing (U.S. Patent No. D285687), 16 September 1986
Keypad (U.S. Patent No. D286047), 7 October 1986
Disk drive housing (U.S. Patent No. D286050), 7 October 1986
Disk drive case (U.S. Patent No. D290257), 9 June 1987
 Equatorial sundial apparatus utilizing one or more concave cylindrical focusing mirrors (U.S. Patent No. 6301793), 16 October 2001

Teaching
Manock is a part-time lecturer on product design at the University of Vermont.

Family
Manock married Mary Ellen Tobey; they have two daughters, Abigail and Katherine.

Bibliography

IPD team

References

External links
Website of Manock Comprehensive Design, Inc.
Macintosh 128K Home Computer at the Museum of Modern Art

1944 births
Living people
Industrial designers
Stanford University alumni
Place of birth missing (living people)
Apple Inc. employees